Elena Asher is an American entrepreneur, eyelash extension artist and educator. She is the founder and owner of LashMakers, an eyelash extension brand.

Early life 
Asher was born in Noyabrsk, Russia, and moved to Israel with her family when she was 13 and began her first job as a part-timer at a flower shop. By the age of 21, she relocated to the US.

Career 
In 2011, Asher founded LashMakers after acquiring certificates and receiving a license as a cosmetic artist. Asher participated in conferences as a key speaker and served as a judge in several eyelash artistry competitions.

In 2021, she released an interview-styled educational series, LashMakers. The series teaches lash art and business programs and certifies over 400 students yearly.
As of 2022, Asher is the owner of LashMakers, and she is also serving as an eyelash extension and business educator at the same organization.

References 

American businesspeople
Living people
Expatriates in the United States
People from Yamalo-Nenets Autonomous Okrug